Fitler is an unincorporated community in Issaquena County, Mississippi, United States. Fitler is located on Mississippi Highway 1, approximately six miles west of Onward. Fitler had a post office from about 1901 to 1976.

In 2012, a  alligator was taken at a hunting camp near Fitler, setting a new Mississippi weight record.

Robert E. Foster, who served in the Mississippi House of Representatives from 1912 to 1931, lived in Fitler.

References

Unincorporated communities in Issaquena County, Mississippi
Unincorporated communities in Mississippi
Mississippi populated places on the Mississippi River